The 2018–19 Tunisian Ligue Professionnelle 1 (Tunisian Professional League) season was the 93rd season of top-tier football in Tunisia.
The defending champions from the previous season are Espérance de Tunis. The competition began on 18 August.

Teams
A total of 14 teams will contest the league.

Stadiums and locations

League table

Results

Leaders

See also
2018–19 Tunisian Ligue Professionnelle 2
2018–19 Tunisian Cup
2020 Tunisian Super Cup

References

External links
 2018–19 Ligue 1 on RSSSF.com
 Fédération Tunisienne de Football

Tunisian Ligue Professionnelle 1 seasons
Tunisia
1